The Women's Long Jump athletics events for the 2012 Summer Paralympics took place at the London Olympic Stadium from August 31 to September 7, 2012. A total of 6 events were contested incorporating 9 different classifications.

Schedule

Results

F11/12

F13

F20

F37/38

F42/44

F46

References

Athletics at the 2012 Summer Paralympics
2012 in women's athletics
Women's sport in London